Elm Mills is an unincorporated community in Barber County, Kansas, United States.

History    
A post office was opened in Elm Mills in 1878, and remained in operation until it was discontinued in 1893.

References

Further reading

External links
 Barber County maps: Current, Historic, KDOT

Unincorporated communities in Barber County, Kansas
Unincorporated communities in Kansas